Adam's Apple is a 1928 British silent comedy film directed by Tim Whelan, in his directorial debut. It starred Monty Banks, Lena Halliday and Judy Kelly. It was made by British International Pictures at their Elstree Studios.

Premise
An American on his honeymoon in Paris, organises the kidnapping of his interfering mother-in-law.

Cast
 Monty Banks as Monty Adams
 Gillian Dean as Ruth Appleby
 Lena Halliday as Mrs. Appleby
 Judy Kelly as Vamp
 Colin Kenny as Husband
 Dino Galvani as Crook
 Hal Gordon as Drunk
 Charles O'Shaughnessy as Official

References

Bibliography
 Low, Rachael. History of the British Film, 1918-1929. George Allen & Unwin, 1971.
 Wood, Linda. British Films 1927-1939. British Film Institute, 1986.

External links

1928 films
1928 comedy films
1928 directorial debut films
British comedy films
1920s English-language films
Films directed by Tim Whelan
British silent feature films
Films shot at British International Pictures Studios
Films set in Paris
British black-and-white films
1920s British films
Silent comedy films
Films about honeymoon
Films about kidnapping in France